Allan K. Fitzsimmons is the Wildlands Fuel Coordinator at the United States Department of the Interior. This is a newly created position where he will coordinate and implement fuels treatment on lands managed by the Bureau of Indian Affairs, Bureau of Land Management, Fish and Wildlife Service and the National Park Service.

Career
Fitzsimmons has 25 years of experience working with natural resource issues previous to this position, including previous service at the Interior Department. From 1983 to 1985 he served as a special assistant to the Deputy Director of the National Park Service. From 1985 to 1989 he was the special assistant to the assistant Secretary for Fish and Wildlife and Parks and from 1989 to 1992 the special assistant to the Deputy Under Secretary for Policy, Planning and Development at the Department of Energy.

Personal
Fitzsimmons and his wife reside in Woodbridge, Virginia. They have three daughters.

Philosophical and political views
Fitzsimmons’ views regarding ecosystem management, specifically endangered species, have created some controversy among environmentalists, such as Friends of the Earth. In his 1999 book Defending Illusions: Federal Protection of Ecosystems, he renounces the existence of ecosystems, claiming they are merely “mental constructs.”  Interior Secretary Gale Norton, who appointed Fitzsimmons to the Fuel Coordinator position, feels confident that Fitzsimmons has a “wide range” of experience with environmental issues.

References

External links
https://web.archive.org/web/20071025114552/http://www.doi.gov/news/020828.htm

Living people
United States Department of the Interior officials
United States Fish and Wildlife Service personnel
National Park Service personnel
Year of birth missing (living people)